Benton Township may refer to:

Arkansas
 Benton Township, Faulkner County, Arkansas
 Benton Township, Fulton County, Arkansas

Illinois
 Benton Township, Franklin County, Illinois
 Benton Township, Lake County, Illinois

Indiana
 Benton Township, Elkhart County, Indiana
 Benton Township, Monroe County, Indiana

Iowa
 Benton Township, Benton County, Iowa
 Benton Township, Cass County, Iowa
 Benton Township, Des Moines County, Iowa
 Benton Township, Fremont County, Iowa
 Benton Township, Keokuk County, Iowa
 Benton Township, Lucas County, Iowa
 Benton Township, Ringgold County, Iowa
 Benton Township, Taylor County, Iowa
 Benton Township, Wayne County, Iowa

Kansas
 Benton Township, Atchison County, Kansas
 Benton Township, Butler County, Kansas
 Benton Township, Hodgeman County, Kansas

Michigan
 Benton Charter Township, Michigan
 Benton Township, Cheboygan County, Michigan
 Benton Township, Eaton County, Michigan

Minnesota
 Benton Township, Minnesota

Missouri
 Benton Township, Adair County, Missouri
 Benton Township, Andrew County, Missouri
 Benton Township, Atchison County, Missouri
 Benton Township, Cedar County, Missouri
 Benton Township, Crawford County, Missouri
 Benton Township, Daviess County, Missouri
 Benton Township, Douglas County, Missouri, in Douglas County, Missouri
 Benton Township, Holt County, Missouri, in Holt County, Missouri
 Benton Township, Howell County, Missouri
 Benton Township, Knox County, Missouri
 Benton Township, Linn County, Missouri
 Benton Township, Newton County, Missouri, in Newton County, Missouri
 Benton Township, Osage County, Missouri
 Benton Township, Wayne County, Missouri

Ohio
 Benton Township, Hocking County, Ohio
 Benton Township, Monroe County, Ohio
 Benton Township, Ottawa County, Ohio
 Benton Township, Paulding County, Ohio
 Benton Township, Pike County, Ohio

Pennsylvania
 Benton Township, Columbia County, Pennsylvania
 Benton Township, Lackawanna County, Pennsylvania

South Dakota
 Benton Township, McCook County, South Dakota, in McCook County, South Dakota
 Benton Township, Minnehaha County, South Dakota, in Minnehaha County, South Dakota
 Benton Township, Spink County, South Dakota, in Spink County, South Dakota

See also
 Benton (disambiguation)

Township name disambiguation pages